Arno Allan Penzias (born April 26, 1933) is an American physicist, radio astronomer and Nobel laureate in physics. Along with Robert Woodrow Wilson, he discovered the cosmic microwave background radiation, which helped establish the Big Bang theory of cosmology.

Early life and education
Penzias was born in Munich, Germany, the son of Justine (née Eisenreich) and Karl Penzias, who ran a leather business. His grandparents had come to Munich from Poland and were among the leaders of the Reichenbach Strasse Shul. At age six, he and his brother Gunther were among the Jewish children evacuated to Britain as part of the Kindertransport rescue operation.  Some time later, his parents also fled Nazi Germany for the U.S., and the family settled in the Garment District of New York City in 1940. In 1946, Penzias became a naturalized citizen of the United States. He graduated from Brooklyn Technical High School in 1951 and after enrolling to study chemistry at the City College of New York, he changed majors and graduated 1954 with a degree in physics, ranked near the top of his class.

Following graduation, Penzias served for two years as a radar officer in the U.S. Army Signal Corps. This led to a research assistantship in the Columbia University Radiation Laboratory, which was then heavily involved in microwave physics. Penzias worked under Charles Townes, who later invented the maser.

Next, Penzias enrolled as a graduate student at Columbia in 1956. He earned a Ph.D. in physics from Columbia University in 1962.

Career

Penzias went on to work at Bell Labs in Holmdel, New Jersey, where, with Robert Woodrow Wilson, he worked on ultra-sensitive cryogenic microwave receivers, intended for radio astronomy observations.  In 1964, on building their most sensitive antenna/receiver system, the pair encountered radio noise which they could not explain. It was far less energetic than the radiation given off by the Milky Way, and it was isotropic, so they assumed their instrument was subject to interference by terrestrial sources.  They tried, and then rejected, the hypothesis that the radio noise emanated from New York City.  An examination of the microwave horn antenna showed it was full of bat and pigeon droppings (which Penzias described as "white dielectric material").  After the pair removed the dung buildup the noise remained.  Having rejected all sources of interference, Penzias contacted Robert Dicke, who suggested it might be the background radiation predicted by some cosmological theories. The pair agreed with Dicke to publish side-by-side letters in the Astrophysical Journal, with Penzias and Wilson describing their observations and Dicke suggesting the interpretation as the cosmic microwave background radiation (CMB), the radio remnant of the Big Bang. This allowed astronomers to confirm the Big Bang, and to correct many of their previous assumptions about it.

He was elected a Fellow of the American Academy of Arts and Sciences and the National Academy of Sciences in 1975. Penzias and Wilson received the 1978 Nobel Prize, sharing it with Pyotr Leonidovich Kapitsa (Kapitsa's work on Low-temperature physics was unrelated to Penzias and Wilson's).  In 1977, the two had received the Henry Draper Medal of the National Academy of Sciences. In 1979, Penzias received the Golden Plate Award of the American Academy of Achievement. He is also the recipient of The International Center in New York's Award of Excellence. In 1998, he was awarded the IRI Medal from the Industrial Research Institute.

On April 26, 2019 the Nürnberger Astronomische Gesellschaft e.V. (NAG) inaugurated the 3-m radio telescope at the Regiomontanus-Sternwarte, the public observatory of Nuremberg, and dedicated this instrument to Arno Penzias.

Penzias has been a resident of Highland Park, New Jersey. He has a son, David, and two daughters, Mindy Penzias Dirks, PhD, and Rabbi Shifra (Laurie) Weiss-Penzias.  He currently serves as a venture partner at New Enterprise Associates.

Works

 Cite Video | BBC/WGBH BOSTON | NOVA #519 | A Whisper From Space | Copyright 1978 | Available With Permission | Consolidated Aircraft - Ronkonkoma, New York

See also

 Discovery of cosmic microwave background radiation
 List of Jewish Nobel laureates

References

External links

  including the Nobel Lecture, December 8, 1978 The Origin of Elements
 The first part of an article authored by Arno Penzias that was published in Science Reporter magazine
 The second part of an article authored by Arno Penzias entitled Ideas
 A Whisper From Space (IMDb)
 Nürnberger Astronomische Gesellschaft e.V.: Web-Seite Arno-Penzias-Radioteleskop (german)

1933 births
Living people
Nobel laureates in Physics
American Nobel laureates
Members of the United States National Academy of Sciences
American astronomers
Jewish astronomers
City College of New York alumni
Columbia Graduate School of Arts and Sciences alumni
Columbia University staff
German emigrants to the United States
Jewish American scientists
Jewish physicists
People from Highland Park, New Jersey
Kindertransport refugees
Scientists at Bell Labs
Fellows of the American Academy of Arts and Sciences
Radio astronomers
Members of the United States National Academy of Engineering
Brooklyn Technical High School alumni
Scientists from New York (state)
Fellows of the American Physical Society